Iain Brunskill (born 5 November 1976) is an English former  footballer who was most recently assistant head coach of Queens Park Rangers. He was assistant head coach to Neil Critchley at Blackpool, a role he began in February 2022 before leaving Blackpool in June 2022 following the departure of Critchley to Aston Villa. He has previously coached at Liverpool, Blackburn Rovers and Norwich City in England, and in Malta, Norway, Jordan and China.

As a player, he was a trainee and professional player at Liverpool, and was also at Bury, Leek, Hednesford Town and Runcorn Halton.

Career

Player

Iain was an England international at schoolboy and youth level before joining Liverpool FC. as a full time player. Between 1995 and 1996, Brunskill was a trainee and young professional player at Liverpool making over 50 appearances for the Liverpools Reserve team . In 1996, he joined Bury, where he remained for a season. In 1997, he joined Leek Town in the Vauxhall Conference making 80 appearances , followed by stints at Hednesford Town and Runcorn Halton, for whom he made one appearance in the FA Cup
Overall he made over 200 appearances in professional and semi professional football before retiring at 26 years old to pursue a full time career in coaching.

Coaching
In 1998, Brunskill began his coaching career Liverpool as Assistant Academy Technical Director, a role he held for ten years.

After leaving Anfield, Brunskill became reserve-team manager and first-team coach at Blackburn Rovers, working with Paul Ince initially, then Sam Allardyce.

After four seasons at Ewood Park, in 2013 he took on his first head-coach role, at Maltese club Floriana. He was given a ten-game contract, which lasted from January to May.

In 2013, he became a youth coach educator with the Football Association.

Brunskill next joined Bolton Wanderers' player development department, before beginning a two-year role as the Under-23s coach of the Jordan national team.

He undertook a consultancy role at Chinese Super League club Shanghai SIPG, then joined Norwegian club Molde as Head of academy.

In 2018, the Chinese Football Association hired Brunskill as the head of its technical department.

After three years in China, he joined Norwich City as senior development coach in January 2022.

On 9 February 2022, Brunskill was appointed assistant head coach to Neil Critchley at Blackpool, replacing Stuart McCall, who left for Sheffield United three months earlier. He worked with Blackpool's first-team coach Mike Garrity at Liverpool. 

On 11 December 2022, following the appointment of Critchley as head coach of Queens Park Rangers, Brunskill again followed him as joint assistant head coach.

References

External links

Living people
1976 births
People from Ormskirk
English footballers
Liverpool F.C. players
Bury F.C. players
Leek F.C. players
Hednesford Town F.C. players
Runcorn F.C. Halton players
Association football coaches
Liverpool F.C. non-playing staff
Molde FK non-playing staff
Blackburn Rovers F.C. non-playing staff
Norwich City F.C. non-playing staff
Blackpool F.C. non-playing staff
Queens Park Rangers F.C. non-playing staff
English football managers
Floriana F.C. managers